The designation of high endurance cutter (WHEC) was created in 1965 when the United States Coast Guard adopted its own designation system. High endurance cutters encompass the largest cutters previously designated by the United States Navy as gunboats, destroyer escorts, and seaplane tenders. The term High Endurance Cutter may refer to any of five individual ship classes that have seen service in the Coast Guard.
The Legend-class cutter is the  newest class in this category.
The  is a contemporary design. These vessels are also known as Secretary- or Hero-class cutters. They are currently being replaced by newer Legend-class cutters.
The  was a World War II design, the last was retired in the 1970s.
The  was a pre-World War II design, the last was retired in the 1980s under the Philippine Navy.
The , a  class from 1936 to the mid-1980s.

Class history

The US Coast Guard's predecessor, the U.S. Revenue Cutter Service designated cutters and craft based on classes. From approximately 1890 through to the formation of the US Coast Guard in 1915, the largest cutters were considered "First" class, coastal cutters and large tugs "Second" class, and small tugs and cutters "Third" class. Small harbor craft and similar vessels were referred to as "Launches".

With the formation of the US Coast Guard in 1915 classes were replaced by names. First class vessels became Cruising Cutters, while second and third class vessels became Harbor Cutters. This was further divided in 1920 when former second class ships were designated Inshore Patrol Cutters. Small craft continued to be referred to as Launches.

Starting during Prohibition as part of the US Coast Guard's response to liquor smuggling, the service commissioned a number of ex-US Navy destroyers to enhance the fleet. These vessels were classified as Coast Guard Destroyers until 1942 when the Coast Guard adopted Navy-style ship classifications. To distinguish US Navy ships from Coast Guard ships, the prefix letter "W" was affixed in front of all Coast Guard ship classifications. "W" was selected as it was unused in the Navy, and was thus free to be assigned without changing or confusing existing classifications.

Following the conclusion of World War II, the Coast Guard was transferred back to control of the US Treasury Department, but retained the ship classification system.

In 1965 the Coast Guard began classifying all large cutters as High Endurance Cutters (WHEC).

Coast Guard Destroyers

During prohibition and post-World War II, several destroyers and destroyer escorts were transferred to the Coast Guard.

s

 
 
 

s

 
 
 
 

s

 
 

s

 
 
 

s

 
 
 
 
 
 
 
 
 
 
 
 

s

 
 
 
 
 
 

s

References

 US Department of Homeland Security. United States Coast Guard Historian's Office
 US Department of Homeland Security. United States Coast Guard Historian's Office

External links 
 Coast Guard gunboats(WPG) & Coast Guard High Endurance Cutters(WHEC): 1945-2010